Henri Gautier, sometimes called Hubert Gautier (21 August 1660 – 27 September 1737) was a French engineer. He was born in Nîmes, France.

Career 
Gautier initially trained as a medical doctor, turning to mathematics and finally engineering. He served as an engineer for 28 years in the province of Languedoc. He was appointed Inspecteur général des ponts et chaussées in 1713, and moved to Paris where he continued working until his retirement in 1731.

In 1716, he wrote the first book on building bridges, Traité des ponts. 
He died in Paris, France at the age of 77.

Publications 
Gautier wrote several published works on engineering, civil engineering and geology.

 La bibliotheque des philosophes, volumes I-II

References

French civil engineers
Corps des ponts
French bridge engineers
1660 births
1737 deaths
People from Nîmes